Mohd Noor Hazrul bin Mohd Mustafa (born 11 October 1988 in Perak) is a Malaysian professional footballer. Currently he plays for BRM FC. He started his career as a defender, but is mostly used as a midfielder.

Career 

He started his football career with his home state team, Perak FA. He represented Perak for the 2006 Sukma Games in Kedah. He was also part of the Malaysia team that gave a good account of themselves in the Champions Youth Cup 2007 tournament, which was held in Kuala Lumpur. He was promoted to the senior Perak FA team for the 2008 season.

Noor Hazrul made his first team debut on 18 November 2007, coming on as a substitute in a match against DPMM FC. He made his first start against UPB-MyTeam FC on 21 November 2007. He scored his first ever senior goal on 12 January 2008 against title rivals Kedah FA. However, Perak FA lost that match 2–5. After four years playing for Perak FA, he decided to join the east coast side, Kelantan FA and quickly gained the attention of The Red Warriors fan after scoring a goal in his debut for the team.

Career statistics

Club

References

External links
 
1988 births
Living people
Malaysian footballers
Perak F.C. players
Perlis FA players
People from Perak
Kelantan FA players
Negeri Sembilan FA players
Malaysian people of Malay descent
Association football defenders
Association football midfielders